The Antiochian Orthodox Archdiocese of Santiago and All Chile is the Greek Orthodox Church of Antioch archdiocese in Chile. Its current Metropolitan is Sergio Abad.

The Greek Orthodox Christians built  in Santiago in 1917. It is a cathedral of the Church of Antioch with six parishes.

References

External links
 

Greek Orthodox Church of Antioch
Eastern Orthodox dioceses in South America
Religion in Chile